The Ashland tragedy is the name given to the violent murder of three teenagers, Robert and Fannie Gibbons and Emma Carico, in Ashland, Kentucky in 1881.

Synopsis

Robert and Fannie Gibbons and Emma Carico (otherwise known under her stepfather's surname of Thomas), staying together at the Gibbons home in Ashland, were beaten to death with axes on the night of December 23, 1881. Afterwards, the murderers set the house on fire. Emma's mother, next door, saw the flames and sounded an alarm. Neighbors found the three victims inside.

George Ellis, a bricklayer, soon confessed to the crime, and implicated fellow workers William Neal and Ellis Craft. The three were taken to a Catlettsburg jail, removed to avoid a lynch mob, and returned for trial on January 16, 1882. Neal and Craft were convicted in a ten-day trial and sentenced to death; they appealed the verdict.

Ellis was tried May 30, convicted, and given a life term, but a mob removed him from the jail on the night of the 31st and lynched him in Ashland. 

To avoid another lynch mob threat, Craft and Neal were moved under heavy guard by the steamboat Granite State from Catlettsburg to Ashland on November 1.  They were met along the shore of Ashland by a crowd, eighteen of whom attempted to intercept the steamboat in a ferry. Two shots were fired. Subsequent volleys from the steamboat's complement of state guards killed four people on the riverbank.

Craft and Neal were found guilty in separate trials at Grayson, Kentucky. Craft was hanged on October 12, 1883, and Neal on March 27, 1885.

Victims

In The Ashland Tragedy, the three victims are described vividly, as follows:
Fannie Gibbons, part of the well-known Gibbons family of the area, is called "a handsome girl" with a "cheerful disposition and winning manners" and "many friends."
Robert Gibbons, the brother of Fannie, who had lost a leg "some years before in an awful event", when he had accidentally fallen "in front and under an empty car that was being pushed along a track by some of the employees of the Norton Iron Works."
Emma Carico, better known as Emma Thomas, was a "well-developed, fine-looking girl, who was loved by all who knew her."

In music
The Ashland tragedy has been described several times in song, most notably by Elijah Adams, who was the half-brother of Richard Adams, who was part of the Grand Jury at Neal and Craft's trials.

References 

1881 in Kentucky
Murder in Kentucky
Crimes in Kentucky
1881 murders in the United States
 Axe murder
Ashland, Kentucky
Lynching deaths in Kentucky